Sergei Evgenyevich Voronov (born October 3, 1987) is a retired Russian figure skater. He is the 2017 ISU Grand Prix NHK Trophy winner, a two-time European medalist (2014 silver, 2015 bronze), the 2014–15 Grand Prix Final bronze medalist, a two-time World Junior medalist (2006 silver, 2007 bronze), and a two-time Russian national champion (2008, 2009).

Personal life
Sergei Evgenyevich Voronov was born in 1987 in Moscow. The International Skating Union gives October as his month of birth while the Russian skating federation lists November.

Career

Early years 
Voronov began skating in 1991. He broke his collarbone two years later while skating. Voronov was coached by Rafael Arutyunyan in Moscow until 2000 when Arutyunyan moved to the U.S. Voronov decided to move to Saint Petersburg where he was coached by Galina Kashina for two years and then switched to Alexei Urmanov.

2004 to 2008

Voronov withdrew from the 2005 World Junior Championships after the qualifying round due to an injury which kept him off the ice for three months. He had placed sixth in the qualifying round.

Voronov withdrew from the 2007 Skate Canada International before the event due to a recurring foot injury. He placed fourth in the free skate at the 2008 World Championships and finished 7th overall.

2009–10 season
In the 2009–10 season, Voronov was assigned to the 2009 Cup of China, where he took bronze, and 2009 Trophée Eric Bompard, where he was sixth. He won the silver medal at the 2010 Russian national championships. Voronov was sent to Europeans but his 14th-place result led Russia to assign the country's second men's spot at the Olympics and Worlds to Russian national bronze medalist Artem Borodulin (along with Evgeni Plushenko). Plushenko's withdrawal from the 2010 World Championships due to injury allowed Voronov to be called up as a late replacement. Voronov would place 14th. This placement, along with Borodulin's withdrawal during the competition, meant Russia would have one men's berth to the 2011 World Championships. At the end of the season, he left coach Alexei Urmanov and moved back to Moscow to be coached by Nikolai Morozov.

2010–11 season
For the 2010–11 season, Voronov was assigned to the 2010 Cup of China and the 2010 Trophée Eric Bompard. He was injured during the short program at Cup of China and withdrew from the event and from Trophee Bompard. He competed at Russian Nationals where he placed 10th in the short program, 3rd in the long, and 4th overall, just 0.27 points off the podium.

2011–12 season
Voronov finished 17th at the 2012 World Championships in Nice, France. He withdrew from the 2012 World Team Trophy due to an ankle fracture which he sustained in Nice.

2012–13 season
Voronov won the bronze medal at the 2012 Cup of China, his third Grand Prix medal. He finished 7th at the 2012 NHK Trophy and won the silver medal at the 2013 Russian Championships. On 4 April 2013, Morozov confirmed that Voronov had left his group.

2013–14 season
Voronov joined Eteri Tutberidze and Sergei Dudakov. In the 2013–14 season, he won silver at his first event, the 2013 Finlandia Trophy, and finished ninth at his sole Grand Prix event, the 2013 NHK Trophy. After winning the gold medal at the 2013 Golden Spin of Zagreb, Voronov took bronze at the 2014 Russian Championships. Appearing in his sixth European Championships, he won the silver medal with a new Personal Best overall score of 252.55 points.

2014–15 season

In the 2014–15 season, Voronov's first assignment was the 2014 Rostelecom Cup; he won the silver medal, behind Spain's Javier Fernández. After taking silver at the 2014 NHK Trophy, he qualified to his first Grand Prix Final. At the Final, he was awarded the bronze medal behind gold medalist Yuzuru Hanyu and silver medalist Fernández.

Voronov won silver at the 2015 Russian Championships behind Maxim Kovtun and was sent to the 2015 European Championships, where he took bronze behind Fernandez (gold) and Kovtun (silver). With that, he ranked second in the ISU World Standings for men's singles with 3839 points, behind Yuzuru Hanyu. Voronov competed at the 2015 World Championships in Shanghai with an aggravated knee injury. He placed fourth in the short program, 17th in the long, and 13th overall.

2015–16 season
Voronov placed fifth at the 2015 Cup of China, sixth at the 2015 Rostelecom Cup, and fifth at the 2016 Russian Championships. He received no ISU Championship assignment but was invited to the 2016 Team Challenge Cup to compete as a member of Team Europe. His team finished second to North America.

Voronov changed coaches in spring 2016, joining Inna Goncharenko.

2016–17 season
In October 2016 Voronov won the gold medal at the 2016 CS Ondrej Nepela Memorial. In his Grand Prix events, he placed 4th at the 2016 Skate America and 3rd at the 2016 Cup of China.

At the 2017 Russian Championships Voronov finished 7th.

2017–18 season
Before his Grand Prix series events Voronov competed in two Challenger events. His first event was 2017 CS Ondrej Nepela Trophy where he won the silver medal behind his teammate Mikhail Kolyada. He then skated at the 2017 CS Minsk-Arena Ice Star where he won the gold medal.

In November 2017 Voronov won his first Grand Prix series gold medal when he won the 2017 NHK Trophy with a personal best score of 271.12 points. He then won the bronze medal at the 2017 Skate America. These results qualified him to the 2017–18 Grand Prix Final where he placed 4th after placing 5th in the short program and 5th in the free skate.

In December 2017 Voronov placed 4th at the 2018 Russian Championships after placing 4th in the short program and 3rd in the free skate.

2018–19 season
Voronov started his season in mid September by competing at the 2018 CS Ondrej Nepela Trophy, where he won the silver medal behind his teammate Mikhail Kolyada. In October Voronov won the bronze medal at the 2018 Skate America. In early November Voronov competed at his second Grand Prix event, the 2018 NHK Trophy. He was ranked second in both programs and won the silver medal behind Shoma Uno. With one silver medal and one bronze medal he qualified for the 2018–19 Grand Prix Final, where he finished sixth.  

Voronov's season ended prematurely when an injury compelled him to withdraw from the Russian Championships.

2019–20 season
Voronov began the season with a sixth-place finish at the 2019 CS Finlandia Trophy.  At his first Grand Prix assignment, the 2019 Internationaux de France, he placed sixth as well.  Voronov finished fourth at the 2019 NHK Trophy, and placed ninth at the 2020 Russian Championships.

On September 11, 2020, Voronov announced his retirement from competitive figure skating.

Post-competitive career 
Voronov joined the coaching team of Evgenia Tarasova / Vladimir Morozov for the 2020–21 season.

Programs

Competitive highlights 
GP: Grand Prix; CS: Challenger Series; JGP: Junior Grand Prix

Detailed results
Small medals for short and free programs awarded only at ISU Championships. At team events, medals awarded for team results only.

References

External links 

  
 

Russian male single skaters
World Junior Figure Skating Championships medalists
European Figure Skating Championships medalists
Figure skaters at the 2007 Winter Universiade
Universiade medalists in figure skating
1987 births
Figure skaters from Moscow
Living people
Universiade silver medalists for Russia